The 74th Flying Training Wing was wing of the United States Army Air Forces.  It was last assigned to the Eastern Flying Training Command, and was disbanded on 30 December 1945 at Maxwell Field, Alabama.

The wing's mission was to provide classification and preflight testing of aviation cadets.  It was one of three such centers, the others being at Maxwell Field, Alabama and Santa Ana Army Air Base, California.

History
The mission of the wing was to provide both Classification and Preflight stage training to air cadets which had completed Training Command basic indoctrination training.
 Classification Stage processed the cadet and issued him his equipment. This was the stage where it would be decided whether the cadet would train as a navigator, bombardier, or pilot.
 Pre-Flight Stage taught the mechanics and physics of flight and required the cadets to pass courses in mathematics and the hard sciences. Then the cadets were taught to apply their knowledge practically by teaching them aeronautics, deflection shooting, and thinking in three dimensions.

Once the cadet successfully completed the training at the center, they would be assigned to one of the AAF primary flight schools for initial flying training.

The wing also provided specialized flight training for foreign pilots as well as a navigation school at Selman, Louisiana that encompassed the entire range of training from preflight ground school to advanced navigation training.

Lineage
 Established as 74th Flying Training Wing on 14 August 1943
 Activated on 30 December 1943
 Disbanded on 1 November 1945

Assignments
 Army Air Forces Eastern Flying Training Command, 25 August 1943 – 30 June 1945

Units

 Maxwell Field, Montgomery, Alabama
 Army Air Forces Classification Center, 25 April 1942 – 7 July 1942
 1176th Preflight Training Squadron, 1 March 1943-29 February 1944
 AAF Flying School
 Opened August 1940 for Free French Pilots (Basic, BT-13).  Transferred to Gunter Field, Gunter 1941 and began Advanced, Single-Engine school for basic graduates from Gunter.   Flight training ended December 1945
 Gunter Field, Montgomery, Alabama
 AAF Flying School (Basic)
 86th Basic Flying Training Group
 Opened: 1941 Closed: December 1945 (BT-13, BT-4)
 Basic training for Free French Pilots

 Selman Army Airfield, Monroe, Louisiana
 3d Preflight Training Group (Bombardier/Navigation)
 AAF Navigation School
 41st, 42d Navigation Training Groups
 Opened: August 1942, Closed: December 1945 (AT-7, BT-13, A-28)
 Selman AAF was unique as it was only at Selman that a cadet could get his entire training (pre-flight, and advanced), and wind up with a commission and navigators wings without ever leaving the field. Women Airforce Service Pilots (WASP) squadrons were assigned to Selman AAF to provide navigational flying to train cadets

Stations
 Maxwell Field, Alabama, 16 September 1943 – 30 December 1945

See also

 Army Air Forces Training Command
 Other Training Command Preflight/classification Units:
 78th Flying Training Wing (World War II) Central Flying Training Command
 81st Flying Training Wing (World War II) Western Flying Training Command
 Other Eastern Flying Training Command Flight Training Wings:
 27th Flying Training Wing (World War II) Basic Flight Training
 28th Flying Training Wing (World War II) Advanced Flight Training, Single-Engine
 29th Flying Training Wing (World War II) Primary Flight Training
 30th Flying Training Wing (World War II) Advanced Flight Training, Two Engine
 75th Flying Training Wing (World War II) Gunnery
 76th Flying Training Wing (World War II) Specialized Four-Engine Training

References

Training wings of the United States Army Air Forces
1943 establishments in Alabama
1945 disestablishments in Alabama